"It Wouldn't Hurt to Have Wings" is a song written by Jerry Foster, Roger Lavoie and Johnny Morris, and recorded by American country music artist Mark Chesnutt.  It was released in December 1995 as the second single from the album Wings.  The song reached number 7 on the U.S. Billboard Hot Country Singles & Tracks chart and number 4 on the Canadian RPM Country Tracks chart.

Critical reception
Deborah Evans Price, of Billboard magazine reviewed the song favorably, saying that Chesnutt "makes the trials of heartbreak sound survivable in this fiddle-laced tune that eloquently states, 'They say time can fly like a magical thing, but it sure wouldn't hurt to have wings.'"

Chart performance
"It Wouldn't Hurt to Have Wings" debuted at number 60 on the U.S. Billboard Hot Country Singles & Tracks for the week of December 30, 1995.

Year-end charts

References

1995 singles
Mark Chesnutt songs
Song recordings produced by Tony Brown (record producer)
Decca Records singles
Songs written by Jerry Foster
1995 songs